Arthur H. Benade  (January 2, 1925 – August 4, 1987) was an American physicist and acoustician, researcher, professor, and author. He is best known for his research on the physics of woodwinds and brass instruments, and for two books, Horns, Strings, and Harmony (1960), and Fundamentals of Musical Acoustics (1976).

References 

1925 births
1987 deaths
Acousticians
American physicists
Manhattan Project people
Washington University in St. Louis alumni
People from Cleveland
People from Chicago
Case Western Reserve University faculty
Deaths from melanoma
ASA Gold Medal recipients
American musical instrument makers